Steven Paul Foley (born 21 June 1953 in Clacton-on-Sea, Essex) is an English former professional footballer who made nearly 300 appearances in the Football League playing as a midfielder for Colchester United. He spent ten years on the coaching staff of Norwich City before moving to rivals Ipswich Town.

Foley began his football career as a trainee with Colchester United. He played for Colchester for ten years, scoring 54 goals from 283 games in the Football League, and then played for Braintree Town. He joined the coaching staff at Colchester, working with the young players, and spent several spells as caretaker manager during the 1980s. He also spent time as a youth team coach at Watford.

He joined Norwich City in 1996, appointed by manager Mike Walker, who had worked with Foley at Colchester, and had spent ten years with the club in various roles when his coaching contract was terminated with immediate effect in May 2006. Chairman Roger Munby said that, although Foley's input had been "invaluable", it was time to "freshen up the coaching set-up", though the press suggested that Foley was being made the scapegoat for the team's poor performance during the 2005–06 season. Foley then joined the coaching staff at Norwich City's arch rivals Ipswich Town.

In February 2019, Foley was inducted into the Colchester United Hall of Fame.

Managerial statistics

References

External links
 

1953 births
Living people
People from Clacton-on-Sea
English footballers
Association football midfielders
Colchester United F.C. players
Braintree Town F.C. players
English Football League players
English football managers
Colchester United F.C. managers
Watford F.C. non-playing staff
Norwich City F.C. non-playing staff
Ipswich Town F.C. non-playing staff
Association football coaches